Todzha Lake, also known as Azas Lake, is a lake in Tuva in Russia. 

The Azas River flows into and the Toora-Khem River flows out of Todzha Lake. The lake freezes in early November and remains icebound until the second half of May.

References 

Lakes of Tuva
South Siberian Mountains